XInclude is a generic mechanism for merging XML documents, by writing inclusion tags in the "main" document to automatically include other documents or parts thereof. The resulting document becomes a single composite XML Information Set. The XInclude mechanism can be used to incorporate content from either XML files or non-XML text files.

XInclude is not natively supported in Web browsers, but may be partially achieved by using some extra JavaScript code.

Example 
For example, including the text file license.txt:

 This document is published under GNU Free Documentation License

in an XHTML document:

<?xml version="1.0"?>
<html xmlns="http://www.w3.org/1999/xhtml"
      xmlns:xi="http://www.w3.org/2001/XInclude">
   <head>...</head>
   <body>
      ...
      <p><xi:include href="license.txt" parse="text"/></p>
   </body>
</html>

gives:

<?xml version="1.0"?>
<html xmlns="http://www.w3.org/1999/xhtml"
      xmlns:xi="http://www.w3.org/2001/XInclude">
   <head>...</head>
   <body>
      ...
      <p>This document is published under GNU Free Documentation License</p>
   </body>
</html>

The mechanism is similar to HTML's <object> tag (which is specific to the HTML markup language), but the XInclude mechanism works with any XML format, such as SVG and XHTML.

See also 
 XPath

References

External links 
 XInclude Standard
 XInclude with XSLT
 Using XInclude in Xerces
 Using XInclude article by Elliotte Rusty Harold

XML-based standards